Sergio Garcia (born April 10, 1990) is a Filipino former actor and dancer. He was a member of teen singing and dance group Anim-E.

Career

Aquino along with fellow Anim-E members Emman Abeleda, Rayver Cruz, John Wayne Sace and Mico Aytona, with the exception of Mhyco Aquino, were child actors reintroduced as teen actors by ABS-CBN under Star Magic Batch 11.

Filmography

Television

Film

Awards and nominations

Notes

References

External links

Living people
Star Magic
1990 births